Karauzovići  (Cyrillic: Караузовићи) is a village in the municipalities of Novo Goražde, Republika Srpska and Goražde, Bosnia and Herzegovina.

Demographics 
According to the 2013 census, its population was 16, with 9 of them living in the Novo Goražde part, and 7 in the Goražde part.

References

Populated places in Novo Goražde
Populated places in Goražde